Coracias is a genus of the rollers, an Old World family of near passerine birds related to the kingfishers and bee-eaters. They share the colourful appearance of those groups, blues and browns predominating. The two outer front toes are connected, but not the inner one.

Taxonomy
The genus Coracias was introduced in 1758 by the Swedish naturalist Carl Linnaeus in the tenth edition of his Systema Naturae. The genus name is from Ancient Greek korakías, derived from korax (‘raven, crow’). Aristotle described the coracias as a bird as big as a crow with a red beak,  which some believe to be the chough. The type species was designated as the European roller (Coracias garrulus) by George Robert Gray in 1855.

The phylogenetic relationships among the species were determined in a molecular study published in 2018.

Species
Nine species are recognized:

Former species
Formerly, some authorities also considered the following species (or subspecies) as species within the genus Coracias:
 Olive-backed oriole (as Coracias sagittata)
 Eurasian golden oriole (as Coracias oriolus)
 Black-hooded oriole (as Coracias xanthornus)
 Broad-billed roller (as Coracias glaucurus)
 Broad-billed roller (afer) (as Coracias afra)
 Oriental dollarbird (as Coracias orientalis)
 Australian roller (as Coracias pacifica)

Behaviour and ecology
Coracias rollers are watch-and wait hunters. They sit in a tree or on a post before descending on their prey and carrying it back in the beak to a perch before dismembering it. A wide range of terrestrial invertebrates, and small vertebrates such as frogs, lizards rodents and young birds, are taken. Their prey includes items avoided by many other birds, such as hairy caterpillars, insects with warning colouration and snakes. They often perch prominently whilst hunting, like giant shrikes.

References

External links
Roller videos on the Internet Bird Collection

 
Coraciidae
Bird genera
Taxa named by Carl Linnaeus